Sir Arne's Treasure is a 1919 Swedish crime-drama film directed by Mauritz Stiller, starring Richard Lund, Hjalmar Selander, Concordia Selander and Mary Johnson. It is based on the novel The Treasure by Selma Lagerlöf, originally published in 1903. The story takes place on the Swedish west coast during the 16th century, and revolves around a Scottish mercenary who murders a wealthy family for treasure, only to unwittingly begin a relationship with the surviving daughter of the family.

Plot
After discovering a conspiracy among his Scottish mercenaries, king Johan III orders them to leave the country and puts their commanders in jail. Sir Archie, Sir Filip and Sir Donald, three of the imprisoned commanders, successfully escape and flee to Marstrand, then under Danish rule, in hope of being able to return to Scotland.

Sir Arne of Solberga is introduced as a wealthy man who is said to be under a curse. His treasure is said to have been looted from the monasteries during the Protestant reform, and according to premonitions it will one day be his doom. While dining, Arne's wife has a premonition where three rogues are sharpening very long knives nearby, but is not taken seriously. At night however, the three Scots enter the family's mansion, murder the family, steal Sir Arne's treasure chest and burn down the building. The only survivor is the daughter Elsalill.

Elsalill is taken care of by a fisherman who lets her live with him in Marstrand, where also the Scottish officers have arrived and are waiting for the ice to break so they can sail away. Eslalill encounters Sir Archie, and they both fall in love without recognising each other. Eventually however, Elsalill happens to overhear a conversation between the Scots, and understands who they are. She reports the criminals, but they are backed up by other former mercenaries who also are waiting for the first ship to leave, and the situation becomes violent. Among the fighting, the emotionally shaken Elsalill seeks Sir Archie who deeply regrets his crime, but in the ongoing turmoil, Elsalill is fatally wounded as Sir Archie uses her body as a shield to protect him from the guards who are trying to kill him.

Sir Archie escapes to the frozen-in ship with Elsalill's dead body. The ice still won't break however, and according to sailor's lore it is because there are evildoers on board. The three officers are soon identified and thrown off the ship. A long procession march over the ice to fetch Elsalill's body and bring it back to land.

Cast

 Richard Lund as Sir Archie
 Mary Johnson as Elsalill
 Hjalmar Selander as Sir Arne
 Concordia Selander as Sir Arne's wife
 Wanda Rothgardt as Berghild
 Axel Nilsson as Torarin
 Erik Stocklassa as Sir Filip
 Bror Berger as Sir Donald
 Josua Bengtson as Jailer

Production
The first plan for a film adaption of Selma Lagerlöf's The Treasure at Svenska Biografteatern, the dominating production company in Sweden during the silent era, was in 1915, but fell through. In 1917 a stage adaptation of the story premiered at Deutsches Theater in Berlin, and an offer was received from a German film company which wanted to adapt it. After the play was staged in Gothenburg the following year, Svenska Biografteatern decided to go ahead and produce the film themselves. The screenplay by Mauritz Stiller and Gustaf Molander differs from the novel in that it tells the story in a more strictly chronological order, and incorporates some details which were introduced in the German play. Stiller also chose to tone down the story's supernatural elements.

Filming took place from 12 February to 10 May 1919, in the studio area of Svenska Filmbiografen, later AB Svensk Filmindustri, on Lidingö, Stockholm, where the alleys of Marstrand had been reconstructed. Other exterior scenes were shot in the nearby area on Lidingö and Lilla Värtan, as well as around Furusund in the Stockholm archipelago, where the ship had been left over the winter and frozen in. Some filming took place further north in Skutskär, and around Sollefteå in Ångermanland.

The film featured handwritten intertitles by Alva Lundin and was the first film to use her artistic title cards.

Other adaptations
Two other film adaptations of the story exist. In 1954 Gustaf Molander directed another Swedish version. A Czechoslovak animated short film directed by Václav Bedřich was made in 1967.

References

External links

 
 

1919 films
1910s historical drama films
Swedish silent feature films
Swedish historical drama films
Swedish crime drama films
1919 crime drama films
Films based on works by Selma Lagerlöf
Films based on Swedish novels
Films set in Sweden
Films set in the 16th century
Films directed by Mauritz Stiller
Swedish black-and-white films
Silent drama films